David Robertson Sawyier (February 2, 1951 – June 10, 2019) was an American rower. He competed in the men's coxed four event at the 1972 Summer Olympics. He graduated from Harvard University.

References

1951 births
2019 deaths
American male rowers
Olympic rowers of the United States
Rowers at the 1972 Summer Olympics
Sportspeople from Chicago
Harvard Crimson rowers